Sensational may refer to:

 Sensational (Yung Gravy album), 2019
 Sensational (Michelle Gayle album), 1997
 Sensational (Erika de Casier album), 2021
 Sensational (horse) (1974–2000), US racehorse
 Sensational (musician) (b. 1974), Guyanese-American hip hop artist
 "Sensational", a song by English singer Robbie Williams, from his 2016 album The Heavy Entertainment Show

See also
 Sensationalism